Stevenson Falls may refer to:
 A common misspelling of Steavenson Falls on the Steavenson River near Marysville, Victoria, Australia (east of Melbourne)
 Stevenson Falls in the Great Otway National Park, Victoria, Australia (southwest of Melbourne)